The Bristol Commercial Historic District is a national historic district in Bristol, Tennessee and Bristol, Virginia.

The district encompasses 83 contributing buildings in the central business district of Bristol. The district straddles the Tennessee-Virginia border. The area was developed in the late 19th and early 20th centuries contains primarily two- and three-story masonry commercial buildings constructed from ca. 1890 to the early 1950s. Notable buildings include the Y.M.C.A (c. 1905), H.P. King Department Store (c. 1905), Reynolds Arcade (1925), Bristol Grocery Company building (c. 1915), Service Mills Company buildings (1922), E.W. King Manufacturing Company (1913), Cameo Theater (1930), Bristol, Virginia Post Office (1933), Central Building (1945), and McCrory's Department Store (1951).  The First National Bank of Bristol (1905), US Post Office-Shelby Street Station (1900), and Paramount Theatre and Office Building (1929-1930) are separately listed.

It was listed on the National Register of Historic Places in 2003, and was slightly increased in size in 2017.

References

National Register of Historic Places in Bristol, Virginia
Beaux-Arts architecture in Virginia
Bristol, Tennessee
Buildings and structures in Bristol, Virginia
Geography of Sullivan County, Tennessee
Historic districts on the National Register of Historic Places in Tennessee
Historic districts on the National Register of Historic Places in Virginia